Artpop is the third studio album by American singer Lady Gaga. It was released on November 6, 2013, by Streamline and Interscope Records. Gaga began planning the project in 2011, shortly after the launch of her second effort, Born This Way. Work continued until 2013 while Gaga was traveling for her Born This Way Ball tour and recovering from surgery for an injury she had sustained while touring. Gaga described Artpop as "a celebration and a poetic musical journey". It displays an intentional "lack of maturity and responsibility" by comparison to the darker and anthemic nature of Born This Way.

Gaga collaborated with various producers on the record, including DJ White Shadow, Zedd, and Madeon. Musically, Artpop is an EDM and synth-pop album, with influences from R&B, techno, industrial, and dubstep, among other genres. The themes of the album revolve around Gaga's personal views of fame, sex and self-empowerment; references include Greek and Roman mythology. It also features guest vocals from T.I., Too Short, Twista, and R. Kelly. In 2019, as a reaction to the documentary Surviving R. Kelly, Kelly's featured song, "Do What U Want", was removed from all streaming and online versions and new vinyl and CD pressings of the album.

The release of Artpop was prefaced by a two-day album release party dubbed ArtRave. The album received generally mixed reviews from music critics, although it was included in several year-end lists by critics and publications. It debuted atop on the US Billboard 200 with first-week sales of 258,000 copies, becoming Gaga's second consecutive number one record in the country. It also topped the charts in Austria, Croatia, Japan, Mexico, Scotland, and the United Kingdom, while charting within the top five in many countries, including Australia, Canada, France, Germany, Italy, New Zealand, Spain, and Switzerland. According to the International Federation of the Phonographic Industry (IFPI), Artpop was the ninth global best-selling album of 2013 with 2.3 million copies worldwide. Despite this, the album was considered by some as a commercial failure compared to Gaga's previous albums.

"Applause" was released as the lead single from Artpop on August 12, 2013, and was a critical and commercial success, charting within the top ten in more than 20 countries worldwide, peaking at number four on the Billboard Hot 100 chart in the United States. The second single, "Do What U Want", was made available on October 21, reaching number 13 in the US. It was followed by promotional singles "Venus" and "Dope" shortly before the album's release. "G.U.Y." was the third and last single released from the album. Gaga promoted Artpop with several television appearances and performances, including her second Thanksgiving Day special. After a short residency at Roseland Ballroom, she embarked on her fourth headlining concert tour, ArtRave: The Artpop Ball.

Background 

Development of Artpop began shortly after the release of Lady Gaga's second studio album Born This Way (2011), and by the following year, its concepts were "beginning to flourish" as Gaga collaborated with producers Fernando Garibay and DJ White Shadow. Initial recording sessions for Artpop coincided with the Born This Way Ball tour (2012–2013), with up to 50 songs sketched out and considered for inclusion. By May 2012, the project was taking definite form, with co-manager Vincent Herbert promising "insane, great records" within its craft. Gaga said that she yearned to make audiences have "a really good time" with Artpop, engineering the album to mirror "a night at the club". "When you listen to it, it really flows nicely. It's really fun to pop in with your friends. I really wrote it for me and my friends to pop in from start to finish", she said in a 2013 interview for MTV. Meanwhile, Gaga began presenting tracks to her record company and hoped to reveal the album's working title by September, a revelation that instead was announced one month in advance. The artist later claimed that Artpop was her first "real" effort that emulated a "phoenix rising from the ashes", reflecting her heightened confidence in writing material for the album compared to her previous efforts.

Gaga recruited Jeff Koons into the project in early 2013, with the two having previously met at a Metropolitan Museum of Art fashion event three years earlier, where Gaga provided a live performance. According to Koons, she "just kind of grabbed ahold of me and gave me a big hug around my waist " and replied, "You know, Jeff, I've been such a fan of yours, and when I was a kid just hanging out in Central Park I would talk to my friends about your work." Following her hip surgery in February 2013, Gaga was forced into a six-month hiatus, during which she studied literature and music with her creative team, the Haus of Gaga in addition to sharing "creative gifts". This stage allowed her to review and enhance her creative direction, which she admitted to be a meticulous "gazing process". "I have to gaze into the work for long periods of time for it to be good," adding that upon analyzing her ideas, she received "that wonderful feeling" which told her "that's the one".

Conception 

Gaga described Artpop as "a celebration and a poetic musical journey" that displayed a "lack of maturity and responsibility", contrary to the dark, anthemic nature of Born This Way. In an August 2013 interview, she told V magazine that she underwent a "cosmetic experience with words" as she examined potential names for the project. "Popart" was initially favored and taken into consideration, but as Gaga questioned "the cultural implication of the words" and the title's evolution post-release, she soon found a "nice ring" to "Artpop". With Artpop, Gaga attempts to inject vulnerability into her work; she also cited Pierrot and Sandro Botticelli's The Birth of Venus (c. 1484–1486) painting as an influence. Gaga admitted to being increasingly self-conscious at the apex of the Born This Way era, and when asked about the decision to refine her image, she responded:

The album's themes primarily revolve around fame, sex, and empowerment, whilst briefly exploring gender roles and marijuana. References include Greek and Roman mythology, and classic jazz and electronic musician Sun Ra. Spencer Kornhaber from The Atlantic saw Artpop as an "attention-freak's manifesto", and interpreted the record's exploration into carnal desire as a facet of the broader idea of "owning up to one's own desire for attention". London Evening Standard John Aizlewood suggested that songs such as "Do What U Want" and "Dope" highlighted Gaga's "curiously submissive" tendencies as a lyricist. Jason Lipshutz from Billboard commented that Artpop "naturally abides" to her "far-reaching ambition" to "re-think the 'pop album' as an entity", while USA Today Jerry Shiver observed the lyrics to foretell "the exploits of an empowered, sexy siren who wrestles with fame", something he expected from Gaga. John Pareles from The New York Times argued that, with Artpop, Gaga reasserted "her need for the love of her audience and announced her new pivot to align herself with the [visual] art world".

Recording 

Gaga composed and produced all the songs on the album, and worked together with DJ White Shadow, Zedd, and Madeon, among other producers. White Shadow told MTV that Gaga texted him less than a week after the release of her previous album, Born This Way, telling him that she already "had the name and the general concept for the record". In his interview with Rolling Stone, he later talked more about their working process: "I was just trying to make something that pushed people's way of thinking a little bit... something a little off from the norm to get people thinking about possibilities. ...[Gaga] wrote this album as we were traveling around the world for the last two years, and we wrote so many songs together." He also recalled that on one occasion, they stayed up for around 20 hours to finish a song, adding: "We never work on one song and finish it and move on. They all get worked on in rotation until literally the day we have to turn it into Interscope."

Gaga had been touring with Zedd during her Born This Way Ball tour. Zedd had previously done a remix of her 2011 single "Marry the Night" and worked on her remix album, Born This Way: The Remix, while Gaga had contributed vocals on an alternate version of Zedd's track, "Stache". Zedd told MTV News that they "both love nothing more than making music, so it was just kind of natural for us to just work on music." He later talked about finding it difficult to complete the project due to their busy schedules and that their work progressed mainly while being on the road during the tour. For French DJ Madeon, this was his first experience collaborating with a vocalist face-to-face, while adding that he "always wanted to work with pop artists and my #1 on my list was Lady Gaga. So when I had the opportunity to do that, I was really thrilled." Gaga praised Madeon's production skills saying, "He is so amazing. He has such an understanding of music at such a young age. He reminds me of myself so much. He's obsessed, so obsessed with music." Madeon also talked about how Gaga did not spare any free time for the song's recording and would usually start the sessions after the Born This Way Ball show performances were over. Artpop marks the first time she worked with will.i.am, on the track "Fashion!", with Gaga saying that they had been trying to work together for years, but they are both very "picky" and they had been waiting for the right song and the "right groove" to collaborate.

In mid-2013, Gaga contacted rappers T.I., Too Short, and Twista to record a song, later revealed to be "Jewels n' Drugs". During an interview with MTV, they confirmed that they recorded their verses separately, mainly due to the tight schedule of the four. Twista further explained that Gaga wanted to "put a vibe of certain artists together" in order to "capture the essence" of what she wanted to do with the song. Gaga also worked with rapper Azealia Banks on two songs, titled "Red Flame" and "Ratchet", but the tracks remained unreleased as their collaboration ended in a dispute. DJ White Shadow explained to the Chicago Tribune that while he was working on "Do What U Want" with Gaga during the European leg of the Born This Way Ball tour, he came up with the idea of bringing Gaga and R. Kelly together for the song, saying that it "seemed logical" to him to put "two writing/singing geniuses on one track". Kelly told Billboard that he enjoyed the song recording process thanks to Gaga's professionalism.  At a press conference in Japan in 2013, Gaga was asked why she worked together with Kelly, but she defended the collaboration, saying: "R. Kelly and I have sometimes had very untrue things written about us, so in a way this was a bond between us." However, after the airing of the documentary, Surviving R. Kelly, in January 2019, which detailed sexual abuse allegations against Kelly, Gaga issued an apology for working with him. She said that her thinking was "explicitly twisted" and that she had "poor judgement" at that time. The song was subsequently removed from all digital versions, and new vinyl and CD pressings of Artpop.

Music and lyrics 
Critical commentary has noted Artpop as an EDM and synth-pop album. It was further described as "coherently channeling R&B, techno, disco, and rock music" by Billboard. Its electronic landscape was initially tailored for Born This Way before Gaga and Fernando Garibay opted for a rock-influenced sound. Sal Cinquemani from Slant Magazine claimed Gaga "continues to be a student" of Madonna as she mirrors Confessions on a Dance Floor (2005) and "Holiday" (1983) with songs such as "Applause" and "Fashion!", and further saw Artpop as a pastiche of Gaga's previous efforts. Adam Markovitz, writing for Entertainment Weekly, echoed this thought, writing that "most of the songs here would fit right in" with The Fame (2008) and Born This Way. Mof Gimmers from The Quietus noticed a "tremendous juggernaut of pop" within the album's frame, while Helen Brown of The Daily Telegraph quipped "it's like wandering drunk around a vast, labyrinthine club, and peering into a disorienting series of darkened rooms in which she tries on various musical genres as if they were hats" in reference to the album's busy soundscape. Ben Kelly from Attitude described Artpop as a "relentless odyssey of electronic sounds" pierced by "strong melodic refrains". Aizlewood of the London Evening Standard said it was built to inspire "hair-waving, body-shaking routines at stadium shows", pinpointing "stentorian keyboards, clattering electro-percussion and thumping backbeats" as the bedrock of the album's production.

Songs 

The album begins with "Aura", a mariachi and EDM song, that has influences from dubstep and Middle Eastern music. It opens with Western-style guitars, Gaga's distorted vocals, and a "maniacal laugh". Throbbing beats lead to the chorus, in which Gaga asks: "Do you wanna see the girl who lives behind the aura, behind the aura?". She explained that in the song she expresses that just because she wears a lot of "visual fashion", "[it] doesn't mean that there is not sort of the same person underneath." These "veils" are protecting her creativity, and her "Aura" is the way that she deals with her "insanity". The album continues with "Venus", a track that shows "retro-futuristic themes", and presents Bowie-esque lyrics about a psychedelic journey. It mentions Venus, the Roman goddess of love, the eponymous planet, and sexual intercourse. It is a synth-pop and dance-pop song. Gaga said that the song is "about finding faith in other places, in the beyond", and also "about sex in the most mythological way."

"G.U.Y." (an acronym for "Girl Under You") is an EDM song with industrial, R&B, and house elements, that was described as a "shuddering dance siren that makes the distinction between gender equality and willful sexual submission". The song involves the concept of new-wave feminism, it is "about being comfortable underneath, because you are strong enough to know that you don't have to be on top to know you're worth it". "Sexxx Dreams" is a synth-pop and R&B song, with inspiration from Prince/Vanity 6 in its production. Its lyrics propose a sexual encounter with a lover whose boyfriend is gone for the weekend. Throughout the song, Gaga alternates her vocal techniques between singing and speaking; the sung verses are addressed to her partner at her side and the spoken ones to the person in her fantasy. The fifth track on the album is "Jewels n' Drugs", a hip hop song with strong influences of trap music that tells a "tale of fame addiction". The lyrics are an "ode to the love of the drug trade" and they are of the "classic rap style".

The next song, "Manicure" (stylized as "MANiCURE") includes handclapping, Gaga shouting "Man! Cure!" and funk guitar arrangements. Its ambiguous lyrics are an "ode to superficial perks”, and talk about physically and spiritually renewing oneself before "getting ready to go out and catch a man or catch a girl". The song is "a lot more rock based than the songs before it on the album" and has "a real pop vibe". "Do What U Want" is an electropop and R&B track, drawing influence from 1980s-inspired throbbing synths and an electronic beat. It has a "somewhat raunchy hook", with Gaga and Kelly alternate singing the lines "Do what u want/ What u want with my body/ Do what u want/ What u want with my body/ Write what you want, say what you want about me/ If you're wondering, know that I'm not sorry". The song's lyrics represent themes of sexual submissiveness, with Gaga telling off detractors and the press that her thoughts, dreams, and feelings are her own, no matter what one does with her body.

The album's title track is a techno song, which has a beat similar to Selena Gomez's 2011 single "Love You like a Love Song" with its electronic composition, and a groove comparable to singer Kylie Minogue's 2001 hit single "Can't Get You Out of My Head". "Artpop" lyrics have been deduced to be a statement about "the subjectivity of art", and Gaga's virtual manifesto with the line "My artpop could mean anything”, telling the audience that she is "an artist that creates for the sake of creation". Gaga explained that the lyrics were a metaphor about love with the chorus line "We could belong together, Artpop". She believed that if her fans and herself could be together, that would probably mean a bonding for art and pop too. "Swine" is a dubstep and industrial song with slight rock and roll influences. It presents "synth washes, a ground-churning bass line, jittery keyboards, hiccuping vocal samples and crescendos leading to drops", with Gaga "screaming and squealing throughout the track." Gaga called "Swine" "very personal", as it is about "some of the more troubling and challenging sexual experiences" she had earlier in her life, alluding to her being raped at age 19 by a producer twenty years older than her.

The tenth song is "Donatella", an "anthem for the outcasts" and an "ode to the head of the Versace fashion house", Gaga's friend, Donatella Versace. Gaga described it as "an incredible crazy fun pop song with really raising electronic beats" about being a fearless woman who is proud of herself. "Fashion!" is a dance song with Daft Punk-influenced instrumentals that portrays Gaga's love for haute couture clothing. Accompanied by a funky beat, the lyrics talk about "being able to get dressed up and feeling like you own the world". Gaga's vocal delivery in the song has been compared to David Bowie's. "Mary Jane Holland" is a dance and synth-pop song with "whirring beats" that talks about using marijuana and "having a great time". Gaga used the name Mary Jane Holland as an alter ego for herself when she got "stoned" in Amsterdam with her friends, who explained how smoking weed helped her putting away the pressure of being famous, and just being able to do whatever she wanted. "Dope" is an electronic rock lament, where Gaga's singing is the focal point of the song, with only piano sounds and distant synths accompanying her "intoxicated", "slur"-like vocals. In order to give the production an intimate feeling and make it emotional, no pitch correction was used to Gaga's voice. According to Gaga, the track is the "sad part" of the story of "Mary Jane Holland". It is about how she developed an addiction to marijuana, using it as a coping mechanism for anxiety, which eventually led to her feeling more "paranoid" and not being "so articulate anymore". Gaga intended the song to be an apology to everybody who dealt with her during this period.

"Gypsy" is a Europop and electropop song with classic rock and house influences, that contains "barroom ivory-tickling" and a "swooping hook". The composition is in a sing-along style, with Gaga belting out "I don't wanna be alone forever, but I can be tonight" during the chorus, talking about navigating an unknown road based only on her instincts. Gaga described the song as being about travelling the world and the loneliness associated with it. The song showcases Gaga's fans as being the people with whom she feels at home, therefore not feeling alone whenever she is in a different country. The lyrics also talk about falling in love while being true to oneself, which was the initial inspiration for the track. Artpop last song is "Applause", which spans genres such as electropop and Eurodance. It features "pulsating synths" and "stuttering synthesizers", which return Gaga to her career roots by mirroring the sounds of her debut album, The Fame. Gaga's vocal acrobatics during the song's verses have been compared to those of Annie Lennox and Grace Jones. According to Gaga, the song's lyrics highlight the difference between an artist and a celebrity. She elaborated, "I live for the applause but I don't live for the attention in the way that people just love you because you're famous. I live for actually performing for people and then them applauding because they've been entertained." Gaga also take shots at those who attempt to analyze her work, with the line: "I stand here waiting for you to bang the gong/ To crash the critic saying 'Is it right or is it wrong?".

Release 
In August 2012, after getting a matching tattoo, Gaga announced on her social media that the record would be titled Artpop, stating that she would prefer it capitalized for stylization. The album was originally expected to be released in early 2013, but was indefinitely postponed after Gaga developed synovitis and a labral tear to her hip that required surgical correction. This resulted in the cancellation of the remainder of her Born This Way Ball. In July 2013, Gaga confirmed that Artpop would be released on November 11, 2013 in the United States. The pre-order of the album was initially supposed to begin on September 1, 2013, but was moved up to August 19, 2013 "due to public anticipation". This was later changed to August 12 to coincide with the early release of "Applause".

In addition to the traditional CD and digital mediums, Gaga announced plans for a multimedia application software which "combines music, art, fashion, and technology with a new interactive worldwide community". She expressed her goal to "bring ARTculture into POP in a reverse Warholian expedition." It was developed by the Haus of Gaga technology division, TechHaus. The app was made compatible with both Android and iOS-running mobile devices, and featured bonus content. It was the third album-app to be released in mainstream commercial markets after Björk's Biophilia (2011) and Jay-Z's Magna Carta Holy Grail (2013). Relative Wave, the architects behind Björk's app, took nearly a year to develop the Artpop app. Some dismissed the project as an elaborate ploy to inflate album sales, under the assumption Billboard would count a downloaded track as a complete unit. Editorial director Bill Werde later addressed these concerns on in July 2013, "As we understand, Gaga fans will get [the] Artpop app for free and can buy the album [through the] app. Albums purchased this way would count on Billboard charts, however, [speculation that the purchase of a single track through the app would count as an album sold is not true]... [also], concerns about self-reported data by Gaga's [team] seem unfounded – sales will be fulfilled and reported by existing digital retailers... [and], for those who may ask: This is obviously different from Jay-Z's Magna Carta Holy Grail / Samsung [deal] which—via an app—gave [his album] for free [and] had no option for fans to buy." Gaga had also planned to release some of the songs that did not make the final album cut via the app, including a track called "Brooklyn Nights", as she "wanted to spend more time" on them, though this plan remained unfulfilled.

Artwork 
On October 7, 2013, Gaga unveiled the album cover for Artpop on Clear Channel billboards around the world. Created by Jeff Koons, the image features a nude sculpture of Gaga with a blue gazing ball in front of her. The background consists of art works including The Birth of Venus, which inspired the music video for "Applause" and the VMA performance of the song. Koons explained the meaning of the cover to MTV:

Will Gompertz from NME wrote that "this is a classic cover. When you're listing the 100 best covers of the 21st century, this will be right up there. Typographically it's an AA+, visually it's AAA". Later, Gaga also revealed on her Facebook page that "the first 500,000 physical copies of Artpop are crafted with LADY GAGA + ARTPOP cut out of hot pink metallic foil plus silver foil. The foiling represents the true design of the cover as imagined by Koons, who hand collaged the typography himself." Koons asked Japanese Psychology professor and artist Akiyoshi Kitaoka to provide visual illusions for the CD interior, including a version of his "Hatpin urchin" illusion that was also printed on the CD itself. The track listing was unveiled in a series of fan posts retweeted by Gaga with pictures of a painted mural made by fans outside of a recording studio in Los Angeles where Artpop was being completed on October 9, 2013. Originally, the track listing was scheduled to be unveiled on September 29, 2013. In a Twitter post, Gaga said it was late due to two songs fighting for the twelfth place on the album. In January 2014, China's Ministry of Culture approved the uncensored release of Artpop in the country, making the album her first to be released in the country after she was blacklisted by the government for inappropriate music in 2011. However, to avoid further controversy with the release, the cover art for the Chinese release was altered to feature Gaga's legs covered in fishnet stockings, with the blue gazing ball enlarged to cover her exposed breasts.

Promotion

Singles 
"Applause" was released as the first single from the album. Due to multiple leaks, it was released ahead of schedule, on August 12, 2013. The single went on to impact mainstream radio stations in the United States on August 19, 2013. It received favorable reviews from music critics, who found it "a return to Gaga's club-friendly Fame era". It charted in the top ten in a number of nations, with a number 4 peak position in the United States. An accompanying music video to "Applause" was premiered and broadcast on jumbotrons across Times Square after her interview on Good Morning America on August 19, 2013. It was shot in Los Angeles by Dutch photographer duo Inez van Lamsweerde and Vinoodh Matadin. It features Gaga in scenes such as being in a birdcage, transforming into a black swan/human hybrid, and dancing in a black-glove bra. The video received positive reviews from critics, saying that it was in "typical Gaga fashion", and noted references to German Expressionist cinema and Andy Warhol.

On September 3, 2013, Gaga started polls on Twitter asking fans to help her choose the second single from Artpop, listing "Manicure", "Sexxx Dreams", "Aura" and "Swine" as options. Gaga revealed the next month that "Venus" had been chosen as the second single, though the popularity of the planned promotional single "Do What U Want" led to its single release instead. It received generally positive response from reviewers, who complimented its chorus and found it a potential radio hit. The song peaked within the top 10 in some countries, including the United Kingdom, Italy, and South Korea,
 as well as the top 20 in other nations, including Germany, Sweden, and the United States. An alternate studio version of "Do What U Want", where the original vocals by Kelly are replaced with new verses sang by Christina Aguilera, was released on January 1, 2014. Two promotional singles were made available from Artpop preceding the album's release: "Venus" on October 28, 2013, and "Dope" on November 4, 2013. The latter reached a top 10 position at the Billboard Hot 100 and some European countries, becoming her highest charting promotional single to date.

"G.U.Y.", the third and final single release impacted mainstream radio stations in the United States on April 8, 2014. It had a mixed reception from music critics; some found it catchy and one of the standout tracks from Artpop, while others criticized its production and the lyrics. The song debuted on the record charts of a few countries, but failed to enter the top ten in most of them. It was accompanied by a music video, shot at Hearst Castle and directed by Gaga, which also incorporated parts of the tracks "Artpop", "Venus", and "Manicure" besides "G.U.Y.". The video shows Gaga as a wounded fallen angel who takes revenge on the men who hunted her after being revived by her followers in a pool. Critics noted the video's "heavy dose of camp and pop culture" and references to Greek mythology.

Live performances and other gigs 

On December 25, 2012, Gaga announced a documentary celebrating "life, the creation of Artpop + you", which she described as a gift to her fans. The documentary was directed by Terry Richardson, a previous collaborator on the photography book Lady Gaga x Terry Richardson, but remained unreleased. Gaga opened the 2013 MTV Video Music Awards with a performance of "Applause", dissecting her career through a series of colorful costumes and wigs. She then headlined the iTunes Festival on September 1, 2013 and performed new material for a crowd of 5,000 people. Gaga dubbed her gig "SwineFest" after one of the songs, "Swine", that she debuted during the event. For the song "Jewels n' Drugs" Gaga was joined onstage by Too Short and Twista – T.I., initially a part of the show, was unable to participate in the festival after his entry in the United Kingdom was denied. While dismissing some of the performed songs, journalists had a mostly positive response to Gaga's set. The show was recorded and later included on a second disc with the deluxe edition of Artpop. On September 9, Gaga performed "Applause" on Good Morning America and appeared dressed as multiple characters from The Wizard of Oz.

A trailer for Machete Kills, in which Gaga played La Chameleón, was released on October 4 and previewed an alternative studio version of "Aura". The song's lyric video, directed by Robert Rodriguez, was uploaded onto Gaga's Vevo account five days later, featuring scenes and dialogue from the film. Excerpts of "G.U.Y.", "Artpop", and "Mary Jane Holland" were released periodically over the course of two weeks from October 14 to 28. On October 24, promotional listening sessions of Artpop were organized in Berlin, with Gaga providing a live rendition of "Gypsy". She then made an unannounced appearance at London's G-A-Y nightclub two days later and performed "Venus", generating controversy when stripped naked during the show. On October 27, Gaga also played "Venus" alongside "Do What U Want" on the tenth series of The X Factor in the United Kingdom. The performance prompted a barrage of complaints to ITV and industry regulator Ofcom, although dismissed by the company. Gaga returned to the United States the following week for a performance of "Dope" at the inaugural YouTube Music Awards, and continued to play material from Artpop on The Howard Stern Show, Saturday Night Live, and at the American Music Awards.

The night before the release of Artpop, Gaga hosted an album release party, dubbed "ArtRave". It took place in a large warehouse in the Brooklyn Navy Yard in New York, and included a press conference and a live performance. During the press conference, Gaga unveiled "the world's first flying dress", and new works by Inez and Vinoodh, avant-garde theater director Robert Wilson, performance artist Marina Abramović and artist Jeff Koons. Gaga performed a concert consisting of nine songs from Artpop, which was streamed live on Vevo and later rebroadcast through the website's syndication partners. It received positive reviews from critics, who complimented Gaga's performance and enthusiasm.

Gaga's second Thanksgiving Day television special, Lady Gaga and the Muppets Holiday Spectacular, aired on November 28, and included performances of "Artpop" with Elton John, "Fashion!" with RuPaul, and "Gypsy" with Kermit the Frog. It had a mixed reception, with some critics praising Gaga for being relatable in the show, while others were highly critical of her for using the holiday special as a mere promotional vehicle for the album. Performances continued in December with an appearance at the British chat show, Alan Carr: Chatty Man, a headlining concert at the Jingle Bell Ball, and a performance in the fifth-season finale of The Voice. On February 18, 2014, Gaga performed the title track on The Tonight Show Starring Jimmy Fallon, and on March 13, she headlined the SXSW festival and performed further songs from the album. The performance of "Swine" received backlash for its inclusion of performance artist Millie Brown, who vomited different colored goo on Gaga as a metaphor for rape.

Residency and tour 

From March 28 to April 7, 2014, Gaga played the final shows at New York's famed Roseland Ballroom before its closure. Her residency, titled Lady Gaga Live at Roseland Ballroom, was originally announced with four shows, with three additional dates later added due to popular demand. As an homage to the venue, the stage was decorated with roses, and Gaga's wardrobe was also rose themed. The residency received positive reviews from music critics, who found it a better representation of Gaga's abilities as an entertainer than her previous campaigns for Artpop. The shows were sold out with ticket prices being above the average costs of tickets at the venue, and the seven dates had sold a total of 24,532 tickets while grossing a total of $1.5 million.

On May 4, 2014, Gaga embarked on the ArtRave: The Artpop Ball tour in support of the album, which had 79 dates overall, with the last show, in Paris, France, being livestreamed online. The show's costume designers and choreographers aspired to make a single, coherent show, and the lighting fixtures were designed and programmed to create "an immersive rave" experience. The tour garnered praise for its entertainment value and Gaga's vocal skills, although the setlist was criticized. It grossed $83 million from 920,088 sold tickets at the 74 reported performances to Billboard Boxscore.

Critical reception 

Artpop received generally mixed response from music critics. Metacritic calculated an average score of 61 out of 100, based on 30 reviews from reviewers. Adam Markovitz from Entertainment Weekly stated that many of the album's songs were "enjoyable but well-worn", further commending the execution of the album and the "melodic lines" of the songs. However, he noted that Artpop generally failed to make an overall impression. Jerry Shriver, writing for USA Today, opined that the record was not "consistently entertaining", though admitted that the album was mostly intended for Gaga's fans and not for general listeners. Slant Magazine''' Sal Cinquemani provided a favorable review, praising its sounds and structures, while Jason Lipshutz from Billboard commended Gaga's effort to make "absolutely certain that every inch of her craft evolves and innovates". In a positive review, an editor of The Daily Beast declared that "there were moments of expected genius on it worthy of Grammy consideration."

Robert Copsey from Digital Spy felt that several songs sounded "half-finished", though suggesting that the album had more good songs than bad tracks. Helen Brown, writing in The Daily Telegraph, criticized Gaga's choice to do another album "themed around her own stardom" (after The Fame and The Fame Monster), and commented that although Gaga approached different genres of music, "she doesn't do anything wildly original with them, but she has fun". Brown however praised the album as "great for dancing". Alexis Petridis from The Guardian suggested there was "some decent pop" on Artpop but thought the art was "rather harder to discern". The Independent Andy Gill commented, "It's hard not to feel underwhelmed by Artpop", while Caryn Ganz from Rolling Stone called it "a bizarre album of squelchy disco" and "sexual but not sexy".

Some journalists felt that the more mixed response from critics in comparison to Gaga's previous work was unfair and stemmed from a focus on Gaga and not the album. Nick Messitte of Forbes criticized music critics, denouncing their reviews as being "incoherent" and focusing on the "artist over the art itself," accusing them of "bend[ing] over backwards to mention everything else before the music". He summarized that Artpop "delivers a welcome departure from standardized verse-chorus structures" and is ultimately a "bold" effort. Ed Potton of The Times concurred, stating that "It's a wonder you can hear Lady Gaga's third studio album over the sound of knives being sharpened" following her previous album Born This Way, a work he felt Artpop was far superior to. Robert Christgau, writing for The Barnes & Noble Review, claimed that the record's "critical reaction [was] clueless", ultimately naming Artpop "2013's most underrated album". In a positive retrospective review, Claire Lobenfeld of Pitchfork called it Gaga's "most divisive and conceptually ambitious album".Artpop was included in several year-end lists by music critics and publications. In their list of the "15 Best Albums of 2013", Billboard ranked it at 14th place, stating that it  is the statement of a singer-songwriter who wants to be more than a pop artist" who "hasn't lost her touch for creating otherworldly hooks." Digital Spy similarly included Artpop in their "30 Best Albums of 2013" list at the 21st place. Popjustice ranked the album at sixth place on their "Top 33 Albums of 2013" list, claiming that it was "amazing", while Entertainmentwise included it in their unranked round-up of the top ten albums of the year, calling Artpop "original and innovative". Robert Christgau named Artpop the sixth best album of 2013 in his year-end list, writing in an accompanying essay for The Barnes & Noble Review, "since unlike the young I'm never bombarded by EDM synths at medically inadvisable volumes, this was not only the rawk album of the year for me, it sounded fresh. Really, who needs guitars?"

 Commercial performance Artpop debuted at number one on the Billboard 200 with 258,000 copies sold in its first week, earning Gaga her second consecutive number one album and becoming the fourth-largest sales week for a female artist in 2013, behind Beyoncé's self-titled album, Katy Perry's Prism, and Miley Cyrus' Bangerz, respectively. The following week, the record dropped to number eight on the Billboard 200 with sales of under 46,000 copies for an 82% sales decrease, making Gaga the first artist to have two albums in the top five list of all-time biggest second-week percentage drops in the Nielsen SoundScan era. On its third week, as part of promotions for Black Friday, Artpop was discounted at retailers such as Amazon MP3, Walmart, and Target, rising to number seven with 116,000 units sold. The album has sold 775,000 copies in the United States as of February 2018 (including 477,000 from physical CD and vinyl sales), and was later certified Platinum by the Recording Industry Association of America (RIAA) for reaching over a million stream-equivalent units. Following Gaga's Super Bowl LI halftime show performance in 2017, Artpop re-entered the Billboard 200 at number 174, selling 5,000 total album-equivalent units

In Canada, the record entered the Canadian Albums Chart at number three with 25,000 copies sold, earning a Platinum certification from Music Canada in its first week of sales for shipment of 80,000 copies. On the first day of its availability in Japan, charts provider Oricon reported that Artpop sold 18,109 physical albums, reaching the number two position. This was 5,000 copies underneath Jin Akanishi's #Justjin, while outperforming Avril Lavigne's self-titled album by 4,000 copies. It went on to sell 58,493 copies to debut atop the Oricon Albums Chart.Artpop also entered the UK Albums Chart at number one with first-week sales of 65,608 copies, making Gaga the third female solo artist in chart history to top the chart with each of her first three studio albums, following Lavigne and Susan Boyle. It fell to number nine in its second week, selling 15,948 copies. The album has been certified Gold by the British Phonographic Industry (BPI), for registered units of 256,000. In Australia, Artpop opened at number two on the ARIA Albums Chart with sales of 15,685 copies. In France, Artpop has sold 65,000 copies.

In 2013, the album brought worldwide sales of 2.3 million units according to the International Federation of the Phonographic Industry (IFPI), making it the ninth best-selling effort of the year. It went on to sell 2.5 million copies as of July 2014. The album's commercial performance has led numerous publications to suggest that it had fallen short of its sales expectations, while some called it as a commercial failure compared to Gaga's previous albums. Due to claims of Artpop alleged underperformance, Gaga publicly addressed rumors that the album's sales had lost her label $25 million and had led to staff layoffs, calling them fake.

 Planned sequel 
In October 2012, Gaga considered Artpop "a bit more modern" and mentioned the possibility of splitting the project into a two-volume record; the first would contain the "commercial songs", while the second would feature the "experimental material". In October 2013, Gaga teased that she had "lots of songs for Act 2". The following month, she mentioned an "Act 2" again, commenting that it might be released before her tour as "it'll be nice to play both acts on the tour", and dismissed her previous ideas of splitting the album into two halves because "this was during the inception of the record and I wasn't even quite sure what Artpop meant yet". In her keynote interview at SXSW, Gaga confirmed that Artpop could potentially have more than two acts, further stating that the second act of Artpop was complete but not ready for release. In April 2014, Gaga stated that "there's a strong possibility" that she will release another volume of Artpop; however, this plan never materialized.

In April 2021, after DJ White Shadow posted an April Fool's joke about the release of Artpop throw-away track "Tea", fans made a petition for Gaga to release the second volume of the album. Following the success of the initiative, he proposed getting the petition to 10,000 signatures and then he would send it to her. After getting over 20,000 signatures in just over a day, White Shadow posted on his Instagram talking about his experience during the era and how he has in fact shared it with Gaga, claiming "she has feelings (like any other normal person) and this 'era' was a hard time for her too. I am sure she will be okay with revisiting it one day and building on it when the time is right". He added, "continue to get your message to the people in charge. You have the power, don't give up". Gaga responded to the fan campaign on Twitter, saying the album's creation "was like heart surgery" and made during a time when she felt desperation as well as pain, and expressed gratitude for how fans celebrated "something that once felt like destruction".

After Gaga's acknowledgment of the campaign and the #BuyARTPOPoniTunes trend, the petition reached 40,000 signatures on change.org. Artpop began climbing up the iTunes charts worldwide, reaching number one in 18 countries including France and Italy, number two in the US, and number three in the UK.

 Track listing 
Credits adapted from the liner notes of Artpop.

 Notes 
  – co-producer
  "Do What U Want" was removed from digital stores and streaming services on January 10, 2019 due to the sexual abuse allegations against R. Kelly. On November 11, 2019, when the album was re-issued on CD and vinyl, "Do What U Want" was excluded from the track list.
 "Venus" contains a publishing sample from "Rocket Number 9", written by Sun Ra, and a sample of "Rocket n°9" by Zombie Zombie.
 "Manicure" is stylized as "MANiCURE".
 "Artpop" is stylized in all caps i.e. "ARTPOP".
 On censored versions of the album, "Sexxx Dreams" is titled "X Dreams", and the title of "Jewels n' Drugs" is bowdlerized as "Jewels n' *****".

 Personnel 
Credits adapted from the liner notes of Artpop''.

Performers 

 Lady Gaga – production, vocals (all tracks); bass arrangement (2); guitar arrangement (4, 8, 14); synth arrangement (7); backing vocals arrangement (8, 9, 14); piano arrangement (8, 14); piano (13); executive producer
 Doug Aldrich – guitar (6)
 Sean C. Erick – horn (6)
 Natalie Ganther – backing vocals (5, 8, 9, 14)
 Nicole Ganther – backing vocals (5, 8, 9, 14)
 Lyon Gray – backing vocals (5, 8, 9, 14)
 R. Kelly – vocals (7)
 Jason Lader – digital editing, keyboards, recording (13)
 Hugo Leclercq – arrangement, co-production, synth parts (2); drum programming (12); mixing, production (12, 14)
 Donnie Lyle – bass guitar (4); musical director for R. Kelly (7)
 Adam MacDougall – keyboards (13)
 Nick Monson – additional production (2, 4); bass arrangement, synth parts (2); co-production (5, 6, 8, 9, 15); guitar arrangement (8)
 Rick Pearl – additional programming (4, 6, 8, 9, 15); programming (5)
 Pierre-Luc Rioux – guitar (11)
 Leon H. Silva – horn (6)
 Tim Stewart – guitar (2, 4, 6, 7, 14)
 T.I. – rap (5)
 Ricky Tillo – guitar (12)
 Joanne Tominaga – arrangement, instrumentation
 Too Short – rap (5)
 Giorgio Tuinfort – instrumentation, piano, production, programming, recording (11)
 Twista – rap (5)
 Bijon S. Watson – horn (6)
 will.i.am – instrumentation, production, programming, vocal recording (11)
 Kevin Williams – horn (6)

Production and recording 

 Gretchen Anderson – production
 George Atkins – recording (11)
 Sam Biggs – recording assistant (11)
 Paul "DJ White Shadow" Blair – production (4–9, 15); co-executive producer
 Delbert Bowers – mixing assistant (2, 5, 12–14)
 Elliot Carter – additional recording (5)
 Jon Castelli – mix engineering (9)
 Dave "Squirrel" Covell – recording assistant (13)
 Daddy's Groove – mixing (11)
 Lisa Einhorn-Gilder – production coordinator
 Steve Faye – recording assistant (13, 14)
 Chris Galland – mixing assistant (2, 5, 12–14)
 Abel Garibaldi – recording (R. Kelly vocals) (7)
 Gene Grimaldi – mastering
 David Guetta – production (11)
 Vincent Herbert – A&R, executive producer
 Justin Hergett – assistant mix engineering (9)
 Ryan Hewitt – recording (13)
 Ghazi Hourani – additional recording (2, 4, 7, 14); mixing assistant (4, 6, 7, 15); recording assistant (5)
 Infected Mushroom – production (1)
 Eric Lynn – recording assistant (13)
 Bill Malina – additional recording (2, 6, 13, 14); additional mixing (4, 6, 7, 15); guitar arrangement (4); recording (4, 5, 7, 14)
 Manny Marroquin – mixing (2, 5, 12–14)
 Tony Maserati – mixing (9)
 Ian Mereness – recording (R. Kelly vocals) (7)
 Sean Oakley – recording (13)
 Benjamin Rice – recording assistant (1–10, 12, 14, 15); mixing assistant (4, 6–8, 15); recording (4, 5, 8, 9, 12, 14); assistant programming (9)
 Andrew Robertson – recording assistant (4, 6, 12, 14, 15)
 Rick Rubin – production (13)
 Dave Russell – recording (1–10, 12, 14, 15); mixing (6–8, 15)
 Andrew Scheps – additional mixing (13)
 Ryan Shanahan – mixing assistant (1, 3, 10)
 Zane Shoemake – recording assistant (R. Kelly vocals) (7)
 Joshua Smith – recording assistant (13)
 Jesse Taub – mixing assistant (1, 3, 10)
 Austin Thomas – recording assistant (4)
 Daniel Zaidenstadt – recording assistant (4, 5, 8, 9, 14); additional recording (5, 9)
 Zedd – mixing, production (1, 3, 10)
 Dino Zisis – additional mixing (4, 7–9); additional production (4); co-production (5, 6, 8, 9, 15)

Design 
 Frederic Aspiras – hair
 Sonja Durham – instructional voice (3); creative coordination
 Jeff Koons – album cover, package design
 Brandon Maxwell – fashion director
 Julian Peploe – text layout
 Tara Savelo – makeup

Charts

Weekly charts

Monthly charts

Year-end charts

Decade-end charts

Certifications and sales

Release history

References

External links 
 Artpop  at LadyGaga.com

2013 albums
Albums produced by Lady Gaga
Albums produced by David Guetta
Albums produced by Nick Monson
Albums produced by Rick Rubin
Albums produced by will.i.am
Albums recorded at Record Plant (Los Angeles)
Albums recorded at Shangri-La (recording studio)
Electronic dance music albums by American artists
Interscope Records albums
Interscope Geffen A&M Records albums
Lady Gaga albums